'Renyel Eligio Pinto Cumache (born July 8, 1982) is a Venezuelan professional baseball pitcher who is a free agent. He played for the Florida Marlins of Major League Baseball (MLB) and the Fukuoka SoftBank Hawks of Nippon Professional Baseball (NPB).

Career

Chicago Cubs
In , Pinto was named the Cubs' minor league pitcher of the year, after going 11–8 with a Southern League-leading 2.92 ERA while pitching for the Double-A West Tenn Diamond Jaxx. He earned mid-season and post-season SL All-Star honors and was promoted to the Triple-A Iowa Cubs.

Florida Marlins
He was called back up to the major leagues when the teams expanded to their 40-man rosters.

In , Pinto made his mark in the Marlins bullpen being used as a very good situational lefty early in the season. He excelled against lefties and was difficult on righties with his improving changeup.

In , Pinto stepped back into his situational lefty role, but he has been used many times as a multi-inning reliever and was even considered for a rotation spot during spring training. He has excelled during this season in all the roles he's been used in.

St. Louis Cardinals
On June 23, 2010, Pinto was released by the Florida Marlins after being designated for assignment and signed with the St. Louis Cardinals.  On August 21, 2010, the Cardinals released him.

Fukuoka SoftBank Hawks
Pinto signed with the Fukuoka SoftBank Hawks of Nippon Professional Baseball for the 2012 season. He was released on April 11, 2012.

Diablos Rojos del Mexico
On April 18, 2014, Pinto signed with the Diablos Rojos del Mexico of the Mexican Baseball League. He was released on May 3, 2014.

Piratas de Campeche
On April 20, 2022, Pinto signed with the Piratas de Campeche of the Mexican League, after nearly 8 years out of professional baseball. He made 5 bullpen appearances and registered a 7.94 ERA. Pinto was released on May 9, 2022.

See also
 List of Major League Baseball players from Venezuela

References

External links

1982 births
Living people
Albuquerque Isotopes players
Arizona League Cubs players
Caribes de Anzoátegui players
Caribes de Oriente players
Daytona Cubs players
Diablos Rojos del México players
Florida Marlins players
Fukuoka SoftBank Hawks players
Iowa Cubs players
Jupiter Hammerheads players
Lansing Lugnuts players
Major League Baseball pitchers
Major League Baseball players from Venezuela
Memphis Redbirds players
Mexican League baseball pitchers
New Orleans Zephyrs players
Nippon Professional Baseball pitchers
People from Miranda (state)
Tiburones de La Guaira players
Venezuelan expatriate baseball players in Japan
Venezuelan expatriate baseball players in Mexico
Venezuelan expatriate baseball players in the United States
West Tennessee Diamond Jaxx players